Chinese rose is a common name for several plants and may refer to:

 Hibiscus rosa-sinensis
 Rosa chinensis, native to southwestern China